Sergey Grigoryevich Rusak (born 3 September 1993) is a Belarusian footballer who plays for Slutsk.

References

External links

Profile at FC Minsk website

1993 births
Living people
Belarusian footballers
Association football midfielders
Belarusian expatriate footballers
Expatriate footballers in Russia
Expatriate footballers in Lithuania
FC Minsk players
FC Torpedo Minsk players
FC Fakel Voronezh players
FK Palanga players
FC Smolevichi players
FC Slutsk players
FC Belshina Bobruisk players